Thriller 40 is the 40th-anniversary edition reissue of American singer Michael Jackson's sixth studio album, Thriller (1982). The original album has sold 70 million copies worldwide, making it the best-selling album of all time. Thriller 40 was released on November 18, 2022, in cooperation with Epic, Legacy Recordings and MJJ Productions. It is Jackson's first posthumous album since Scream (2017). It is the third reissue of Thriller, following the 2001 special edition and Thriller 25 (2008).

Background
Jackson released his sixth studio album, Thriller, on November 30, 1982. With sales estimated to be over 120 million copies worldwide, Thriller became the world's best-selling album of all time; the album was the first in history to yield seven top-ten singles. The success of Thriller put Jackson into the dominating position of pop music, becoming an international pop-cultural icon.

Marketing and promotion

The American singer Maxwell performed "The Lady in My Life" at the 2022 Billboard Music Awards. He said, "I'm feeling honored to be here, honored to be able to celebrate the 40th anniversary of Thriller. I've been up since six in the morning trying to get everything together and, you know, just want to do right — it's Michael Jackson. There's nobody better, nobody greater, so I just want to do it well."

Several other activities were planned before the release of Thriller 40. On October 4, music journalist and filmmaker Nelson George announced he was directing a documentary on the making of Thriller, which will include never-before-seen footage.

On November 1, the Michael Jackson Estate and Sony Music launched a worldwide campaign to celebrate the 40th anniversary of the album Thriller, featuring Fan Event Parties, Immersive Experience to be held in two countries: Düsseldorf, Germany on November 10-13 and New York on November 18-20 and there will be an event filming that will be part of a documentary about Thriller on November 30.

On November 14, Sony Music released the 4K version of Jackson's "Beat It" music video on YouTube. A 4K remaster of the "Thriller" short film also appeared on iTunes and Tidal, though it was removed shortly after. On November 17, the 4K remastered "Thriller" short film was released on YouTube.

Bonus material
Thriller 40 includes the original demo for Jackson's song "Behind the Mask" (which was previously reworked for the 2010 posthumous album Michael); the original demo for "Thriller" ("Starlight"); a demo of "Best of Joy" (released in the Michael album), entitled "The Toy" (intended for the 1982 Richard Pryor film of the same name); the previously unreleased songs "She's Trouble", "What a Lovely Way to Go" and "Who Do You Know"; and the tracks “Got The Hots”, "Carousel", "Can't Get Outta the Rain" and "Sunset Driver".

Release
Announced on May 16, 2022, by the Estate of Michael Jackson, Thriller 40 is the twelfth release by Sony and/or Motown since the death of Jackson in 2009. The company also announced additional releases of the original album by audiophile reissue label Mobile Fidelity Sound Lab on both stereo Super Audio CD and LP, limited to 40,000 numbered copies. The latter portion of the announcement was later credited by The Washington Post journalist Geoff Edgers with fueling public skepticism towards Mobile Fidelity that culminated in a subsequent controversy over them using Direct Stream Digital files in vinyl releases that were marketed as coming directly from analog master tapes. The company also surprise released 360 Reality Audio and Dolby Atmos versions of the original album on Amazon Music and Apple Music respectively on the same day as Thriller 40.

Commercial performance
In the United States, as per Billboards rule, Thriller 40 is regarded as the same album as Thriller and re-entered the Billboard 200 albums chart at number seven. The album sold a combined total of about 37,000 copies in the first week in the US. The album charted at number 16 in its second week of the release, selling 18,000 (down 35%).

Track listing

Total duration: 158:30

Notes
  signifies a co-producer

Charts
Album chart usages for Oricon

Release history

Notes

References

2022 albums
Michael Jackson albums
Albums produced by Michael Jackson
Albums produced by Quincy Jones
Epic Records albums
Albums published posthumously
Reissue albums